Garner Lake is a lake in Alberta. It is part of Garner Lake Provincial Park.

References 

Garner Lake
Smoky Lake County
County of St. Paul No. 19